Ponna is a municipality in the province of Como in the Italian region of Lombardy

Ponna may also refer to:

Places 
 Ponna, a common name for Ixora, a genus of flowering plants in the family Rubiaceae
 Ponna, a village in the town of Ichoda, Adilabad district, state of Telangana, India

People 
 Ponna (poet) (c. 950), a Kannada poet in the court of Rashtrakuta king Krishna II

See also
Pune (previously Poona), city in the Indian state of Maharashtra
Poona Horse, sometimes Ponna Horse, an armoured regiment of the Indian Army